Intrexx is a cross-platform integrated development environment for the creation and operation of multilingual web-based applications, intranets, social intranets, enterprise portals and customer portals (extranets) as well as Industry 4.0 solutions as of 2018. A portal is created based on the drag and drop principle. Intrexx is a low-code development platform. Most applications can be created via drag & drop but manual coding can be added where necessary.

History 
The first version of the software was released by the German software vendor, United Planet, under the name "Intrazone" in 1999. In 2000, the software was renamed to "Intrexx Xtreme". With the release of Intrexx 5.0 in March 2010, the product line was divided into two editions: Intrexx Professional and Intrexx Compact. Intrexx Professional were the continuation of the Xtreme series and were still intended for SMEs and public administrations. Intrexx Compact contained a complete company portal with more than 50 ready-made web-applications and templates and is tailor-made for smaller companies with up to 10 PC workstations. United Planet stopped dividing the product line into two editions with the release of Intrexx 8.0. From this point on, it was simply called Intrexx. According to the manufacturer, there have been implemented more than 5,000 Intrexx portals to date (cited date: 2019). Between 2012 and 2014, the US IT research and advisory company Gartner Inc. placed United Planet with Intrexx in its market overview "Magic Quadrant for Horizontal Portals".

Milestones 

 Intrexx 2.0 (2004): Enhanced tools to integrate existing data from third-party systems
 Intrexx 3.0 (2006): Integration of a so-called "Process Manager", allowing companies to model business processes graphically and automate them
 Intrexx 4.0 (2007): Option to consume and provide web services
 Intrexx 4.5 (2008): Integration of the dynamic programming language "Groovy"
 Intrexx 5.0 (2010):
 Ability to convert web-based applications during their creation so that they can be accessed from mobile devices
 Improved accessibility according to the W3C standards
 Intrexx 6.0 (2012):
 New module "Relationship Designer" allows data to be interconnected (until Intrexx Version 18.09)
 Business Adapters for SAP NetWeaver Gateway and all OData data sources
 Technological basis for the new social business software, Intrexx Share
 Intrexx Share (2013): The social collaboration application Intrexx Share expands the software Intrexx with features known from social networks (Facebook, Twitter etc.). It also integrates software solutions (e.g. Intranet, CRM, ERP, BI, Exchange etc.) from the IT landscape and allows them to create feeds.
 Intrexx 7.0 (2014):
 Further improvements to Intrexx's ability to integrate thanks to the OData Adapter and M-Files Adapter.
 Intrexx formula editor enables users to create computational calculations in the Portal Manager.
 Introduction of the new Calendar and Resource controls.
 User-friendlier file handling with multiple file uploads.
 Intrexx 8.0 (2016):
 Intrexx now supports responsive design
 Apache Solr is implemented as a search engine in the context of the portal process
 The search function has been expanded with new filtering options and the ability to search in multiple languages
 Translation support: Language constants and a translation aid
 Element templates and guidelines in the Application Designer
 Intrexx 18.03 (2018):
 New version name
 Connector for Microsoft Office 365; Possible to open and save Office 365 documents directly from Intrexx
 Intrexx Mobile App: Access to key information - including push notifications - on mobile devices
 Intrexx Share updated to 2.2: Social collaboration tools with chat, groups, filebox (file storage system) and news feed
 Intrexx 18.09 (2018):
 Connector API: Ready-made connectors for leading software systems such as SAP, Microsoft, IBM and many other systems
 Intrexx Industrial: Complete Industry 4.0 solution
 Intrexx 19.03 (2019):
 New business logic: New logic for reading, writing, validating and filtering data
 Java 11:Both the Portal Manager and Server are now based on Java Runtime version 11. Users can choose to use existing Java licenses or switch to the open source option OpenJDK.
 REST API: Communication between the Portal Manager and other servers has been switched to the REST API
 Multi-tenancy capability
 Horizontal scaling: Support for the platforms Amazon - AWS, Azure and Open Telekom Cloud
 Versioning: Semantic versioning and versioning with GIT
 New responsive portlet framework
 Intrexx 19.09 (2019):
 Portal Manager as a live version: Start the Intrexx Portal Manager with ease from any directory - even without administrator permissions
 New version of the TinyMCE Editor
 Internationalization: Country-dependent languages and currency formats for an internationally operating company
 Improved security
 Support of 'diverse' as a gender
 Intrexx cluster support included in setup
 Responsive view image control
 Intrexx 20.03 (2020):
 Subselects/Subqueries in filters
 Global workflow user
 Improved style options
 Filter multiple selection elements via dependencies
 Bindings in filters
 New gallery
 WebSockets: Developers can send messages directly from the server to the browser (push).
 Intrexx 20.09 (2020):
 Extended jump options to create new data records from view tables, research tables, charts and free layout tables.
 Improved web server configuration
 New bindings: The new additions are the bindings uniqueID and unique GUID.
 Preset for title fields
 Intrexx 21.03 (2021):
 Short links
 Online application templates: Updated application templates in an online repository
 Support for the SVG format
 Authentication via proxy
Transition to Rolling Releases (2021)

In the fall of 2021, Intrexx has moved away from the old release structure with annual version updates. Instead, new features and functions will now appear in the form of rolling releases. Users of Intrexx can choose between two different release tracks: On the Silent Track, new features will continue to appear in an annual rhythm. On the Steady Track, new features will be implemented directly after their completion in the course of regular software updates.

 New features in the Steady Track (fall 2021)
 New installer
 Customizable and update-proof login
 New style classes for the tile view of view pages in free layout tables
 Support for international emails using Regular Expression

Architecture
Intrexx basically consists of two parts:

Intrexx Portal Manager

It is installed on any client or on the server and possesses all the components for developing and managing layout, menu or applications. Furthermore, users can be configured and provided with permissions for the respective portal applications in the Portal Manager.

Intrexx Portal Server

It is installed on a server and controls all transactions of the created web-based applications and portals. It monitors the permissions of the users within the transactions, controls the entire business logic operations and governs access to the data sources.

Functions
Intrexx provides companies with the ability to create and manage multilingual web-based applications, intranets, social intranets, enterprise portals and customer portals (extranets) as well as Industry 4.0 solutions as of 2018. In doing so, the software sees itself as an alternative to Microsoft SharePoint. Design and usability of the portal are provided by the integrated portal designer based on CSS and XML, enabling the adoption to the corporate identity of the company via XSLT transformations. Single sign-on guarantees a secure authentication and role-based authorization. The synchronization with existing LDAP-servers is possible.

References 

Content management systems
Portal software
Web portals
Service-oriented architecture-related products